Wai Lin Aung (born 20 May 1996) is a footballer from Burma, and a Goalkeeper for the Myanmar national under-23 football team.

He currently plays for Nay Pyi Taw in Myanmar National League.

References

1996 births
Living people
Burmese footballers
Myanmar international footballers
Association football goalkeepers